Cellulose 1,4-beta-cellobiosidase (reducing end) (CelS, CelSS, endoglucanase SS, cellulase SS, cellobiohydrolase CelS, Cel48A) is an enzyme with systematic name 4-beta-D-glucan cellobiohydrolase (reducing end). This enzyme catalyses the following chemical reaction

 Hydrolysis of (1->4)-beta-D-glucosidic linkages in cellulose and similar substrates, releasing cellobiose from the reducing ends of the chains.

The CelS enzyme from Clostridium thermocellum is the most abundant subunit of the cellulosome formed by the organism.

References

External links 
 

EC 3.2.1